The 1965 Arkansas State Indians football team represented Arkansas State College—now known as Arkansas State University—as a member of the Southland Conference during the 1965 NCAA College Division football season. Led by third-year head coach Bennie Ellender, the Indians compiled an overall record of 6–3 with a mark of 1–3 in conference play, finishing last out of five teams in the Southland.

Schedule

References

Arkansas State
Arkansas State Red Wolves football seasons
Arkansas State Indians football